Manuchehr Jamali (7 January 1929–5 July 2012) was a dissident Persian philosopher and poet. He is best known for his exposition and analysis of the Shahnameh of Ferdowsi and his research about the ancient Iranian mythology. Burgwinkel has reviewed his works and the developments of his thoughts and philosophical ideas.

Works
 Das Denken beginnt mit dem Lachen: die unsterbliche Kultur des Iran (Thinking begins with laughter: the immortal culture of Iran), 2009 co-authored with Gita Yegane Arani-May

References

External links
Jamali.info: Official website
Kurmali Press: List of book publications
Exposition by M. Jamali about Rumi: How Molavi Balkhi's (Rumi) thinking takes its roots in the Iranian culture of female deities
The Other Iran: Ressources by Manuchehr Jamali in English and German.

1929 births
2012 deaths
Iranian writers
20th-century Iranian philosophers